= Kentucky Flat, California =

Former settlement in Nevada County, CA, US

Coordinates: 39.2562°N 121.1328°W

Kentucky Flat is a former settlement in Nevada County, California. Dating to 1850, it was first mined by settlers from the U.S. state of Kentucky. Several valuable quartz leads were discovered in the area, and the diggings were worked with significant profit. In that year, it was considered to be a settlement of some importance. The Kentucky Flat Schoolhouse might be the "oldest continuously used one-room schoolhouse in California".
